Patrick Michael Pacillo (born July 23, 1963) is an American former professional baseball player. Pacillo pitched for the Cincinnati Reds of the Major League Baseball (MLB) in 1987 and 1988.

Career

Pacillo grew up in Rutherford, New Jersey and played both baseball and football at Rutherford High School.

In 1982 and 1983, Pacillo played collegiate summer baseball for the Harwich Mariners of the Cape Cod Baseball League (CCBL). He played outfielder and pitcher, batting .338 in 1983 and leading Harwich to the league title. Pacillo was inducted into the CCBL Hall of Fame in 2005.

He was drafted by the Cincinnati Reds in the 1st round (5th pick) of the 1984 MLB draft out of Seton Hall University, where he had played baseball for the Pirates under head coach Mike Sheppard.

On May 23, 1987, Pacillo made his MLB debuted. In his MLB debut he pitched 5 innings and gave up 2 earned runs while striking out 3.

In 1988, Pacaillo was traded to the Montreal Expos along with Tracy Jones for Randy St. Claire, Jeff Reed, and Herm Winningham. He never pitched in the majors again.

Pacillo is perhaps best remembered for replacing Pete Rose on the Reds' 40-man roster following the 1986 season. Rose, who by that point was serving as the team's player-manager, removed himself from the roster in order to make room for Pacillo.

A resident of Bradley Beach, New Jersey, Pacillo works as a financial adviser.

1984 Olympics
During the 1984 Summer Olympics, Pat played baseball for the United States team. Notable teammates included Will Clark, Barry Larkin, Mark McGwire, B. J. Surhoff, Bill Swift, and Bobby Witt. The US team lost in the final to Japan.

References

Sources
Pat Pacillo - Baseballbiography.com

1963 births
Living people
American expatriate baseball players in Canada
Baseball players at the 1984 Summer Olympics
Baseball players from Jersey City, New Jersey
Calgary Cannons players
Cincinnati Reds players
Denver Zephyrs players
Harwich Mariners players
Indianapolis Indians players
Jacksonville Expos players
Major League Baseball pitchers
Medalists at the 1984 Summer Olympics
Nashville Sounds players
Olympic silver medalists for the United States in baseball
People from Bradley Beach, New Jersey
People from Rutherford, New Jersey
Rutherford High School (New Jersey) alumni
Seton Hall Pirates baseball players
Sportspeople from Bergen County, New Jersey
Tampa Tarpons (1957–1987) players
Vermont Reds players